Trinity Episcopal Chapel is a 19th-century Episcopal church located at Morley, St. Lawrence County, New York, designed by the architect Charles C. Haight in the Gothic Revival style and consecrated in 1871. The sanctuary is 24 feet by 62 feet with a gable roof, and the chancel, a rear wing, measures 16 feet by 24 feet. The chapel walls are brick and faced with fieldstone.

It was listed on the National Register of Historic Places in 1990.

References

Churches on the National Register of Historic Places in New York (state)
Episcopal church buildings in New York (state)
Gothic Revival church buildings in New York (state)
Churches in St. Lawrence County, New York
National Register of Historic Places in St. Lawrence County, New York
Episcopal chapels in the United States